Desulfofaba hansenii is a bacterium from the genus of Desulfofaba which has been isolated from the roots of the seagrass Zostera marina in Denmark.

References

External links 
Type strain of Desulfofaba hansenii at BacDive -  the Bacterial Diversity Metadatabase

Desulfobacterales
Bacteria described in 2001